Nevşehirli Damat Ibrahim Pasha (  1662 - 1 October 1730) served as Grand Vizier for Sultan Ahmed III of the Ottoman Empire during the Tulip period. He was also the head of a ruling family which had great influence in the court of Ahmed III. The epithet "Nevşehirli" (meaning "from Nevşehir") is used to distinguish this Grand Vizier from another, Damat Ibrahim Pasha (died 1601).

Early life

He was born in Nevşehir (formerly Muşkara) in 1662, to Sipahi Ali Aga, the voivode of Izdin, and Fatma Hanım.  In 1689 he went to Istanbul, to see his relatives and to find a job.

Achievements
The abilities of Ibrahim, who directed the government from 1718 to 1730, preserved an unusual internal peace in the empire, though the frontier provinces were often the scenes of disorder and revolt. This was repeatedly the case in Egypt and Arabia, and still more frequently in the districts northward and eastward of the Black Sea, especially among the fierce Noghai tribes of the Kuban. The state of the countries between the Black Sea and the Caspian Sea was rendered still more unstable by the rival claims of Russia and the Porte; it was difficult to define a boundary between the two empires in pursuance of the partition treaty of 1723. 

The Tulip period, called Lâle Devri (the Tulip epoch) was a time of extravagant garden parties and sumptuous entertainment. In 1730, when Tahmasp II of Safavid attacked Ottoman possessions, the empire's leadership was caught unprepared. Infuriated by the Ibrahim Pasha's apparent indifference to state affairs and by the sultan's life of inordinate luxury—‘which was rendered the more distasteful to his subjects by its faintly European flavor’—and by his hesitation in taking up the Safavid challenge, the people and troops in Constantinople revolted. They were led by Patrona Halil, an ex-Janissary from Macedonia. Ahmed III sacrificed Ibrahim and other viziers to the mob in order to save himself.

Sultan Ahmed III did not leave İbrâhim Efendi next to him.  He promoted himself quickly and brought rickah-i humayun to the district governor with his wife .  Thus, İbrâhim Pasha, who was a damâd-i nocturnal, remained with the sultan in Istanbul as the district governor with the rank of second vizier during the Austrian campaigns (1717-1718).  Meanwhile, the steadfastness did not accept offers;  He declined to lead the government of a state at war.  During the meeting of the armistice that will end the war with Austria and Venice, He accepted Ahmed's offer of grand vizier.  Unlike the other grand viziers, Ahmed gave his daughter's groom the emerald seal of the Tuğra, which he used, as the “seal of humor”.  

İbrâhim Pasha first discussed the peace talks with Austria that will end the war.  He wrote a letter to the Austrian applicant on peace;  He also sent instructions to the Ottoman delegates.  He left the army and left Edirne in order to be prepared for the possibility that peace talks would not result.  He remained in Sofia until he got the result of peace.  Meanwhile, Austria has aggravated the peace conditions and Turkish delegates were mistreated and interim meetings were interrupted.  However, through the ambassadors of the UK and the Netherlands.  According to this treaty, Small Wallachia, Timişoara, Belgrade, Northern Serbia were left to Austria.  Mora was taken from the Venetians and given back to the Ottoman State.

Letter of Farrukhsiyar

The Mughal Emperor Farrukhsiyar, a great-grandson of Aurangzeb, is also known to have sent a letter to the Ottomans which was received by the Grand Vizier Ibrahim Pasha, providing a graphic description informing him of the efforts of the Mughal commander Syed Hassan Ali Khan Barha against the Rajput and Maratha rebellion.

Marriage and Descendants

Ibrahim Pasha was married to the daughter of the sultan, Fatma Sultan, in 1717 when the Princess was fourteen years old and Ibrahim was fifty years old. This marriage into the Ottoman dynasty earned him the epithet "Damat" (Turkish: bridesgroom, son-in-law). Before, he had another wife, by whom divorced to marry Fatma. They had at least a son, Nevşehirli Mehmed Bey, who marry Atike Sultan, half-sister of Fatma.

Ibrahim and Fatma had two sons and two daughters:
Sultanzade Mehmed Paşah (1718? - 16 June 1778)
Sultanzade Genç Mehmed Bey (March 1723 - 1737)
Fatma Hanımsultan (? - 1765). She had a son, Mehmed Bey, who married his cousin Hatice Hanımsultan, daughter of Saliha Sultan. 
Heybetullah Hanımsultan (? - 1774)

Character
İbrâhim Pasha was a resilient, generous, modest, forward-thinking, supporter of innovation and a man of greatness.  He is renowned for his scholars, poets, and artisans of his time.  He protected his relatives so much that he tried to keep those he saw rivals away from the center.  He was keen on history and fine arts.  He had also learned from the painter Ömer Efendi. 

The translations made by Yanyalı Esad Efendi from Aristotle are dedicated to İbrâhim Pasha.  A thirty-two people delegation consisting of scholars and scribes, which can be considered as the academy of the period, was established in Istanbul in 1725 during the period of his tradition.

Architecture

Ibrâhim Pasha left many charity works.  The most important of these are the mosque, madrasa, classroom, school, fountain, fountain, public bath, inn and double bath in Nevşehir, and the Dardanhadis Masjid, the fountain, the fountain, the library and the source of their income, built together with his wife Fatma Sultan in Şehzadebaşı. Masjid. 

Apart from these, a mosque in Sâdâbâd, a mansion next to Beşiktaş Mevlevi in the Çırağan area in Beşiktaş, next to the Orta Mosque in Yeniodalar in Istanbul and in Sultanahmet and Yalıköy, in Kuruçeşme, and in Bahariye.  In addition, there were fountains, public fountain and pools around Mîrâhur Köşkü and Eyüp, in Şemsipaşa in Üsküdar, around Malatyalı Mosque in Üsküdar, near Çubuklu Mosque and Mesire Fountain in Feyzâbâd.  There were about ten fountains in Ürgüp and a bazaar known as the Egyptian Bazaar by the sea in Izmir.  There were also foundation vineyards and gardens in Antalya, Rumelia and Islands. 

This complex of Nevşehirli Damad İbrâhim Pasha is an architectural work that must be carefully preserved and kept alive without losing its integrity, as well as the importance of the person who built it on the city's busiest main street. It is also one of the last structures of the classical period of Turkish art among small complexes. In addition, the plan arrangement of the complex consisting of a mosque, library, madrasah, fountain and bazaar is an extremely harmonious and successful example, with no other counterpart.

Death
On 1 October 1730 the body of İbrâhim Pasha, who was murdered in the morning on the morning, was handed over to the soldiers with the corpses of their grooms.  The body of İbrâhim Pasha was wandered in the streets of Istanbul and shattered after various insults in Sultanahmet Square.

References

Citations

General references
 Alderson, A.D. The Structure of the Ottoman Dynasty. Greenwood Press: Westport, Connecticut. 1982
 Incorporates text from History of Ottoman Turks (1878)

1730 deaths
Pashas
18th-century Grand Viziers of the Ottoman Empire
18th-century executions by the Ottoman Empire
Turks from the Ottoman Empire
1666 births
Damats
Baltadji